Dolf is a Dutch masculine given name, often a short form (hypocorism) of Adolf, which may refer to:

 Dolf Brouwers (1912–1997), Dutch comedian, singer, and television actor
 Dolf Jansen (born 1963), comedian, presenter of the Radio 2 program Spijkers met Koppen
 Dolf Joekes (1884–1962), Dutch politician
 Dolf Kessler (1884–1945), Dutch football player and industrialist
 Dolf van Kol (1902–1989), Dutch footballer who earned 33 caps for the Dutch national side
 Dolf van der Linden (1915–1999), Dutch conductor of popular music
 Dolf Luque (1890–1957), Cuban Major League Baseball pitcher
 Dölf Mettler (1934–2015), Swiss yodeler, composer and painter
 Dolf van der Nagel (1889–1949), Dutch amateur footballer
 Dolf Rieser (1898–1983), South African born British painter, printmaker, and teacher
 Dolf Roks (born 1962), former amateur footballer from The Netherlands
 Dolf Sternberger (1907–1989), German philosopher and political scientist at the University of Heidelberg
 Dolf Verroen (born 1928), Dutch writer of children's literature
 Dolf de Vries (1937–2020), Dutch actor
 Dolf van der Voort van Zijp (1892–1978), Dutch horse rider
 Dölf Wild (born 1954), Swiss historian and archaeologist
 Dolf Wyllarde (1871–1950), English writer

See also
 Dolph (disambiguation)
 Piz Dolf, a mountain of the Glarus Alps, on the border between the cantons of St. Gallen and Graubünden

Dutch masculine given names